Luciën Dors (born 31 October 1984 in Zeist) is a Dutch footballer, who currently plays for Dutch club VV Maarssen.

Club career
A left-sided winger, Dors made his professional debut for Vitesse in a December 2004 Eredivisie match against FC Utrecht. He later played for  Eerste Divisie club FC Den Bosch during the 2005-2006 football season.

He later played for senior amateur sides DOVO and Bennekom. He joined DFS from Breukelen in summer 2015. Ahead of the 2019/20 season, he joined VV Maarssen.

References

External links
voetbal international profile

1984 births
Living people
People from Zeist
Dutch footballers
Association football wingers
SBV Vitesse players
FC Den Bosch players
VV DOVO players
Eredivisie players
Eerste Divisie players
Footballers from Utrecht (province)